In enzymology, precorrin-3B C17-methyltransferase is an enzyme that catalyzes the chemical reaction

S-adenosyl-L-methionine + precorrin-3B  S-adenosyl-L-homocysteine + precorrin-4

The two substrates of this enzyme are S-adenosyl methionine and precorrin 3B, and its two products are S-adenosylhomocysteine and precorrin 4.

This enzyme belongs to the family of transferases, specifically those transferring one-carbon group methyltransferases.  The systematic name of this enzyme class is S-adenosyl-L-methionine:precorrin-3B C17-methyltransferase. Other names in common use include precorrin-3 methyltransferase, and CobJ.  This enzyme is part of the biosynthetic pathway to cobalamin (vitamin B12) in aerobic bacteria and during this step the macrocycle ring-contracts so that the corrin core of the vitamin is formed.

See also
 Cobalamin biosynthesis

References

 
 

EC 2.1.1
Enzymes of unknown structure